The 2016–17 Coupe de France First preliminary rounds comprised the first rounds of the 2016–17 Coupe de France preliminary rounds. The competition was organised by the French Football Federation (FFF) and was made up of separate sections for each regional league in France as well as the overseas departments and territories (Guadeloupe, French Guiana, Martinique, Mayotte,  Réunion, and Saint Martin).

Second preliminary round

Réunion 

These matches were played between 20 and 25 May 2016.

Second preliminary round results: Réunion

Note: Reúnion League Structure (no promotion to French League Structure):Division 1 Régionale (D1R)Division 2 Régionale (D2R)Division 2 Départementale (D2D)Division 3 Départementale (D3D)

First round

Mayotte 

These matches played on 20 February 2016

First round results: Mayotte

Note: Mayotte League Structure (no promotion to French League Structure):Division d'Honneur (DH)Division d'Honneur Territoriale (DHT)Promotion d'Honneur (PH)

Réunion 

These matches were played between 17 and 19 June 2016.

First round results: Réunion

Note: Reúnion League Structure (no promotion to French League Structure):Division 1 Régionale (D1R)Division 2 Régionale (D2R)Division 2 Départementale (D2D)Division 3 Départementale (D3D)

Paris-Île-de-France 
These matches were played between 24 April and 5 May 2016. Note that Tiers refer to the 2015–16 season.

First round results: Île-de-France

Picardie 
These matches were played between 10 and 25 June 2016. Note that Tiers refer to the 2015–16 season.

First round results: Picardie

Lorraine 
These matches were played between 27 April and 18 June 2016. Note that Tiers refer to the 2015–16 season.

First round results: Lorraine

Bourgogne 
These matches were played between 4 June and 26 June 2016. Note that Tiers refer to the 2015–16 season.

First round results: Bourgogne

Alsace 
These matches were played between 11 and 17 August 2016.

First round results: Alsace

Auvergne 
These matches were played on 20 and 21 August 2016.

First round results: Auvergne

Lower Normandy 
These matches were played on 20 and 21 August 2016.

First round results: Lower Normandy

Bretagne 

These matches were played on 19, 21 and 24 August 2016.

First round results: Bretagne

Centre-Val de Loire 
These matches were played on 20 and 21 August 2016.

First round results: Centre-Val de Loire

Centre-West 
These matches were played on 20 and 21 August 2016.

First round results: Centre-West

Champagne-Ardenne 

These matches were played on 21 August 2016.

First round results: Champagne-Ardenne

Franche-Comté 
These matches were played on 20 and 21 August 2016.

First round results: Franche-Comté

Languedoc-Roussillon 
These matches were played on 19, 20, 21 and 28 August 2016.

First round results: Languedoc-Roussillon

Maine 
These matches were played on 21 August 2016.

First round results: Maine

Midi-Pyrénées 

The first round in Midi-Pyrénées is organised by individual districts. The matches were played on 19, 20 and 21 August 2016.

First round results: Midi-Pyrénées, District de l'Ariège

First round results: Midi-Pyrénées, District de l'Aveyron

First round results: Midi-Pyrénées, District de Haute-Garonne Comminges

First round results: Midi-Pyrénées, District du Gers

First round results: Midi-Pyrénées, District des Hautes-Pyrénées

First round results: Midi-Pyrénées, District du Lot

First round results: Midi-Pyrénées, District du Tarn

First round results: Midi-Pyrénées, District du Tarn-et-Garonne

First round results: Midi-Pyrénées, District de Haut-Garonne

Normandie 

These matches were played on 21 and 28 August 2016.

First round results: Normandie

Aquitaine 
These matches were played on 27 and 28 August 2016.

First round results: Aquitaine

Atlantique 
These matches were played on 27 and 28 August 2016.

First round results: Atlantique

Méditerranée 
These matches were played on 27 and 28 August 2016.

First round results: Méditerranée

Nord-Pas de Calais 

These matches were played on 28 August 2016.

First round results: Nord-Pas de Calais

Rhône-Alpes 

These matches were played on 27 and 28 August 2016.

First round results: Rhône-Alpes

Framing round

Picardie 
These matches were played on 21 August 2016.

Framing round results: Picardie

Bourgogne 
These matches were played on 21 August 2016.

Framing round results: Bourgogne

Notes

References

First preliminary round